The Hwlitsum or Lamalchi or Lamalcha are an indigenous people whose traditional territories were in the Gulf Islands of British Columbia, Canada.  Their traditional villages were on Canoe Pass, which is known in their language as Hwlitsum, and on Kuper Island (called by them Lamalchi, another spelling of their name,) Saltspring Island and Galiano Island.

The Lamalcha War
On 20 April 1863, a shelling of their village on Kuper Island by the Royal Navy's HMS Forward led to a series of events known as the Lamalcha War or Lamalchi Affair.  The reason for the shelling was the colonial authorities of the Colony of Vancouver Island believed the village was home to three men who had killed settlers.  The Lamalcha wound up seizing the ship and sold it (Citation needed), leading to the protracted conflict.  This episode was the only defeat of the Royal Navy in the era following the Crimean War to the opening of the 20th Century. During the war the Lamalcha evaded capture by various other Royal Navy warships, including HMS Satellite.

Eventually four Lamalcha were hung for murder in Victoria and the Lamalcha village confiscated; that area is now home to the Penelakut and Kuper Island's Indian reserves are governed by the Penelakut First Nation.

A detailed account of the events leading to the Lamalcha War is provided by Chris Arnett in "Terror of the Coast - Land Alienation and on Vancouver Island and the Gulf Islands 1849 -1863.”

Political organization

Contemporary landclaim
In 2014 elders of the group filed a land claim in the BC Supreme Courts for large pieces of Stanley Park, Galiano Island and Saltspring Island, overlapping with claims of the Squamish and Musqueam Nations and others (this is common throughout BC).  Currently the Hwlitsum Band is not yet recognized under the federal Indian Act.

A letter of support for their cause was sent to the federal and provincial governments in 2007 by the Union of BC Indian Chiefs.

References

</ref> Arnett, C. (1999)  Terror of the Coast - Land Alienation and on Vancouver Island and the Gulf Islands 1849 -186.  Talon Books, Burnaby, BC.

<ref>

Gulf Islands
First Nations in British Columbia
Coast Salish